Wise Stores was a department store chain located in Eastern Canada. It was founded in 1930 in Montreal by Alex Wise and constituted on March 31, 1949, as Wise Stores inc. It expanded outside of Quebec by opening its first stores in the Maritimes provinces in 1986 and eventually Ontario in 1988.

In 1992, the company acquired the even longer running and competitor Peoples department stores from British retailer Marks & Spencer. Under the terms of the purchase, the Wise and Peoples chains could not completely merge until the outstanding balance owed to Marks & Spencer for the transaction had completely been paid in full. Because of this restriction, Peoples was instead operated as a subsidiary of Wise.

Wise was basically a discount department retailer with store dimensions averaging those of Hart, Greenberg and Peoples; in contrast to the larger-sized Zellers, Woolco and Kmart. Wise created in June 1993 a larger liquidation stores chain under the banner Wizmart. At its peak, the company operated five divisions: Wise Stores inc. (48 stores), Peoples Stores inc. (178 stores), Wizmart, KLHR Liquidation, and NRMA.

In 1994, the company shuttered 13 underperforming Wise and Wizmart stores.

Peoples declared bankruptcy on January 13, 1995, while Wise avoided it but would still get liquidated anyway. Wise eventually  went bankrupt too on January 31, 1995. Wise's incapacity of paying the amount it owed Marks & Spencer for the Peoples acquisition was the main reason for the demise of both chains. The  original Wise store, located on 6751 St-Hubert street in the La Petite-Patrie neighbourhood, operated throughout the entire 65 years of the company. Its founder Alex Wise was with the company for practically its whole existence and was still president in 1994 though he was retired by the time it went bankrupt in 1995. He died on January 12, 2004, at the age of 97, and one of his three sons who presided the company with him, Ralph, died on October 21, 2015.

32 of Wise and Peoples's vacated spaces became Hart Stores in August 1995, a department store chain with a  similar concept. Another 27 former locations of Wise/Peoples were acquired also in August 1995 by Winnipeg-based Gendis which used them to open mainly new Metropolitan Stores, but also stores from its other banners such as Red Apple and Greenberg.

Locations

Quebec
Boucherville — Place Pierre Boucher
Chandler — Rue Commerciale
Chandler — Place du Hâvre (Peoples store)
Chateauguay — Rue Anjou
Delson — Plaza Delson
Gaspé — Place Jacques-Cartier 
Greenfield Park — Place Greenfield Park
Joliette — Les Galeries Joliette
Lachute — Carrefour Argenteuil
LaSalle —Centre Le Cavalier
Laval — Carrefour Laval
Laval — Centre Saint-Martin
Longueuil — Centre Jacques-Cartier 
Longueuil — Chemin de Chambly (Carrefour Super C)
Montmagny — Galeries Montmagny
Montreal — Iberville Street
Montreal — Plaza Côte-des-Neiges
Montreal — Plaza Saint-Hubert
Montréal-Nord — Place Levasseur
Paspebiac — Plaza Paspebiac.
Pierrefonds — Pierrefonds Boul.
Quebec — Carrefour Soumande
Rouyn-Noranda — Les Promenades du Cuivre
Saint-Jean-sur-Richelieu —  Carrefour Richelieu
Sainte-Foy — Place Laurier
Sainte-Foy — Place Sainte-Foy
Saint Léonard — Jean-Talon Street East 
Sherbrooke — Carrefour de l'Estrie
Victoriaville — Boulevard des Bois-Francs N. (Place Sogestec)

Nova Scotia
Bridgewater — Bridgewater Mall
Dartmouth — Mic Mac Mall
Glace Bay — Commercial Street
Liverpool — Main Street
Truro — Truro Mall

New Brunswick
Bathurst — Chaleur Centre Mall
Tracadie — Rue Principale
Shediac — Rue Main

Ontario
Cornwall — Pitt Street
Hawkesbury — Main Street

References

See also
Peoples Department Stores Inc. (Trustee of) v. Wise

Companies based in Montreal
Retail companies established in 1930
Retail companies disestablished in 1995
Defunct retail companies of Canada
Department stores of Canada
Privately held companies of Canada
1930 establishments in Quebec
1995 disestablishments in Quebec